Shungnak Airport  is a state-owned public-use airport located in Shungnak, a city in the Northwest Arctic of the U.S. state of Alaska.

Facilities 
Shungnak Airport has one runway designated 9/27 with a 4,000 x 60 ft (1,219 x 18 m) gravel surface.

Airlines and destinations

References

External links
 FAA Alaska airport diagram (GIF)
 

 

Airports in Northwest Arctic Borough, Alaska
Airports in the Arctic